Dmitri Vitalyevich Gradilenko (born 12 August 1969) is a former Russian professional footballer.

Club career
He made his professional debut in the Soviet Second League in 1986 for FC Krasnaya Presnya Moscow.

Post-playing career
After retirement he worked as a player agent and TV commentator.

On 7 June 2019, Russian Football Union banned him from football activity for one year after he (as a general director of FC Urozhay Krasnodar) offered a 500,000 rubles bonus to FC Chernomorets Novorossiysk before their game against Urozhay's competitor FC Chayka Peschanokopskoye.

Honours
 Soviet Top League champion: 1989.
 Soviet Top League runner-up: 1991.
 Russian Premier League champion: 1993.

European club competitions
With FC Spartak Moscow.

 European Cup 1988–89: 2 games.
 European Cup 1990–91: 4 games.
 UEFA Cup 1991–92: 1 game.

References

1969 births
Footballers from Moscow
Living people
Soviet footballers
Russian footballers
Association football defenders
Soviet Top League players
Russian Premier League players
FC Asmaral Moscow players
FC Spartak Moscow players
PFC CSKA Moscow players
FC Karpaty Lviv players
FC Lada-Tolyatti players
FC Rostov players
FC Torpedo Moscow players
FC Zhemchuzhina Sochi players
FC Lokomotiv Nizhny Novgorod players
Association football commentators
Association football agents